White Bridge or Bridge of Love, is a bridge in Vranje, Serbia.

White Bridge or Whites Bridge may also refer to:

Places
 Athlone Railway Bridge, Co. Westmeath, Republic of Ireland
 White Bridge (Vilnius), a pedestrian bridge in Vilnius, Lithuania
 White Bridge (Mysia), a Roman bridge across the river Granicus in Mysia, now Turkey
 White Bridge (Iran), a suspension bridge located in Ahwaz, Iran
 White Bridge (in ), former (1737–1778) name for the Red Bridge (Saint Petersburg)
 White Bridge (in ), a road bridge in Munich, Germany
 White Bridge, Poland, Ohio, a bridge listed on the NRHP in Mahoning County, Ohio
 Whites Bridge, near Smyrna, Michigan
 Zubizuri (White bridge in Basque language), a pedestrian bridge in Bilbao, Spain

See also 
 Black Bridge (disambiguation)
 Negroponte (disambiguation)
 Whitebridge (disambiguation)